The Zastava M84 is a general-purpose machine gun manufactured by Zastava Arms. It is a gas-operated, air-cooled, belt-fed and fully automatic shoulder-fired weapon.

The M84 is a clone of the Soviet PKM, one difference being in the stock, which is not hollow like the original and is made out of a different type of wood. Another is the contour and weight of the barrel which has slightly different measurements at the gas port and forward of the trunnion in diameter.

Variants

M84 
The M84 is intended for infantry use, and is derived from the Soviet PKM, however the M84 has the flash hider from the original PK. It is also configured for tripod mounting (like the PKS).

M86 
The M86 is a clone of the PKT, and is designed to mount as a coaxial weapon on M-84 tanks and other combat vehicles. The stock, bipod, and iron sights are omitted from this version, and it includes a heavier barrel and electric trigger. Another version, the M86A, is designed for external mounts and can be used dismounted.

Users 

 
 
 : used by the Burkinabese contingent of the United Nations Multidimensional Integrated Stabilization Mission in Mali
 
  Former user, replaced by FN MAG and Ultimax 100
 
 
 
 
 
 
 
  Syrian National Army
 : designated Mitraljez 7.62 mm M84

Gallery

References

External links
 Official website of Zastava Arms
 Zastava M84

General-purpose machine guns
7.62×54mmR machine guns
M84
Machine guns of Yugoslavia
Zastava Arms
Weapons and ammunition introduced in 1984